Pennsylvania Route 752 was a state highway located in Montgomery County, Pennsylvania. The route connected PA 63 to US 611 in Horsham between 1930 and 1940.  The route is today known as Dresher Road.

Route description

PA 752 began at an intersection with PA 63 in Horsham Township, heading northeast on Dresher Road through rural areas. The route crossed Witmer Road and PA 463. PA 752 ended at an intersection with US 611 (now PA 611) in the community of Horsham. Today, Dresher Road is a four-lane undivided suburban highway passing several business parks and residential neighborhoods.

History
PA 752 was first designated by 1930 to connect PA 63 to US 611. By 1940, the route was removed.

Major intersections

See also

References

752